Hon. John Yarde Buller (23 December 1823 – 6 May 1867) was an English first-class cricketer and British Army officer.

The son of politician John Yarde-Buller and Elizabeth Wilson Patten, he was born in December 1823 at Elvaston, Derbyshire. He was educated at Eton College, before going up to University College, Oxford in 1841. He graduated B.A. in 1844, and M.A. in 1847.

Buller made a single appearance in first-class cricket for Oxford University against the Marylebone Cricket Club at Lord's in 1850. Batting twice in the match, he ended the Oxford first-innings of 97 all out unbeaten on 3, while in their second-innings he was dismissed without scoring by Samuel Dakin. He later served in the South Devon Militia, where he gained the rank of Lieutenant-Colonel and succeeded his father in command. Buller married Charlotte Chandos-Pole in January 1845. He died in May 1867 at Chavenage House in Beverston, Gloucestershire, in doing so he predeceased his father. Upon the death of his father, who held the title Baron Churston, he was succeeded as the 2nd Baronet by Buller's son, John. He is the great-great grandfather of Aga Khan IV.

References

External links

1823 births
1867 deaths
People from South Derbyshire District
Cricketers from Derbyshire
People educated at Eton College
Alumni of Balliol College, Oxford
English cricketers
Oxford University cricketers
Devonshire Regiment officers
Eldest sons of British hereditary barons
Heirs apparent who never acceded
John
British Militia officers
Devon Militia officers
Military personnel from Derbyshire